The National Indian Gaming Commission (NIGC) is a United States federal regulatory agency within the Department of the Interior. Congress established the agency pursuant to the Indian Gaming Regulatory Act in 1988.

The commission is the only federal agency focused solely on the regulation of gambling, though it has many counterpart state and tribal regulatory agencies. The U.S. Department of Justice and the Department of the Interior also have responsibilities related to gaming and Indian gaming, respectively.

The commission is an independent regulatory agency, but works closely with the Department of Justice and the Department of the Interior on matters of game classification and Indian lands questions. In addition, it is represented in litigation in court by the Department of Justice.  Thus, its independence has some practical limits related to cooperation with Executive Branch agencies.

History
The Indian Gaming Regulatory Act was enacted to support and promote tribal economic development, self-sufficiency and strong tribal governments through the operation of gaming on Indian lands. The act provides a regulatory framework to shield Indian gaming from corruption, and to ensure that the games offered are fair and honest and that tribes are the primary beneficiaries of gaming operations. The act created the commission to protect tribal gaming as a means of generating revenue for tribal communities. IGRA placed the commission within the Department of the Interior (DOI), but also provided it with independent federal regulatory authority. The commission monitors tribal gaming activity, inspects gaming premises, conducts background investigations and audits of Class II gaming operations (and Class III gaming operations, upon request or as provided by applicable law, such as tribal gaming ordinances and tribal-state compacts). The commission also provides technical assistance and training to tribal gaming commissions and operations and, when appropriate, undertakes enforcement actions.

Because the National Indian Gaming Commission is subject to the Government Performance and Results Act of 1993, they submitted in 2018 a strategic plan to Congress, which covers the fiscal years 2018 to 2022.

Structure
The commission comprises a chair and two commissioners, each of whom serves on a full-time basis for a three-year term. The chair is appointed by the president and confirmed by the senate. The Secretary of the Interior appoints the other two commissioners. Under the act, at least two of the three commissioners must be enrolled members of a federally recognized Indian tribe, and no more than two members may be of the same political party.

In 2010, Barack Obama appointed the first woman to chair the commission, Tracie L. Stevens, a member of the Tulalip Tribes. Stevens was approved by the Senate. Stevens was succeeded in her position by in 2015 by Jonodev Osceola Chaudhuri. Chaudhuri is a member of the Muscogee Nation.

The commission also has a general counsel, who supervises the legal staff and advises the commission on its work. The first general counsel was Michael Cox.  The second general counsel was Barry W. Brandon. The third was Kevin K. Washburn, who later served as Assistant Secretary of Indian Affairs at the Department of the Interior. The fourth general counsel was Lawrence Roberts, who left the commission to become a deputy assistant secretary at the Department of the Interior. The current general counsel is Michael Hoenig.

The commission fulfills its responsibilities under IGRA by:  
 regulating and monitoring certain aspects of Indian gaming;  
 coordinating its regulatory responsibilities with tribal regulatory agencies through the review and approval of tribal gaming ordinances and management agreements; 
 reviewing the backgrounds of individuals and entities to ensure the suitability of those seeking to manage Indian gaming;  
 overseeing and reviewing the conduct and regulation of Indian gaming operations; 
 referring law enforcement matters to appropriate tribal, federal and state entities; and  
 when necessary, undertaking enforcement actions for violations of IGRA, NIGC's regulations and tribal gaming ordinances, including imposing appropriate sanctions for such violations.

The commission provides federal oversight to 472 tribally owned, operated or licensed gaming establishments operating in 28 states. The commission maintains its headquarters in Washington, D.C., and has seven regional offices and two satellite offices. The commission is divided into four separate divisions. Approximately half of the commission staff is assigned to headquarters in Washington, D.C., with the remaining staff assigned to regional offices located in Portland, Oregon; Sacramento, California; Phoenix, Arizona; St. Paul, Minnesota; Tulsa, Oklahoma; Washington, D.C.; and Oklahoma City, Oklahoma; and satellite offices in Rapid City, South Dakota and Temecula, California.

The commission established its field offices to improve the level and quality of services it provides to tribes, and to enhance its ability to communicate, collaborate and interact with tribes located within each office's geographic region. The field offices are vital to carrying out the statutory responsibilities of the commission. By having auditors and compliance officers close to tribal gaming facilities, the commission seeks to facilitate compliance with the act and better relationships with tribal leaders, officials and regulatory personnel. In addition to auditing and investigative activities, the field staff provides technical assistance and training to promote a better understanding of gaming controls within the regulated industry, and to enhance cooperation and compliance to ensure the integrity of gaming operations.

Past commissioners

See also
 Casino
 Gaming Control Board
 Indian Gaming Regulatory Act
 Title 25 of the Code of Federal Regulations

References

External links
 
 National Indian Gaming Commission in the Federal Register

Gambling regulators in the United States
Native American law
United States federal boards, commissions, and committees
Government agencies established in 1988